Kalanikaumakaowākea (or Kalanikaumaka-o-Wākea) was an Aliʻi nui of the island of Maui in ancient Hawaii. He was named after the god called Wākea, who is the Sky father in Hawaiian religion and mythology.

Family 
Kalanikaumakaowākea was the son of the Aliʻi Kauhiakama and his wife, Queen Kapukini III (daughter of Chief Makakaualiʻi); however, some accounts have him the piʻo (the sacred child of the siblings) son of Kauhiakama and his sister Piʻilanikapo. He was a member of the Paumakua dynasty.

Kalanikaumakaowākea married a woman named Kekaikuihala (Kaneakaula), whose parents were Chief Kuhinahinau of Kawaihae and his wife Keakahiwaʻakama.

These are the children of Kalanikaumakaowākea and Kekaikuihala:
Piʻilaniwahine II, mother of Queen Lonomaʻaikanaka
King Lonohonuakini of Maui, named after Lono
Kalanikauanakikilani

Kalanikaumakaowākea also had a second wife named Makakuwahine (wahine = "woman"), who was the daughter of Kanelaʻaukahi and Kamaka, of the Keaunui-a-Maweke-Laakona family. With Makaku, Kalanikaumakaowākea had a son named ʻUmi-a-Liloa II. Another son named Kauloaiwi has an unknown mother.

References

Royalty of Maui